Liard River Corridor Provincial Park and Protected Area is a provincial park in British Columbia, Canada. Part of the park is in the larger Muskwa-Kechika Management Area.

References

Liard Country
Provincial parks of British Columbia
2001 establishments in British Columbia